Wedeler Au (in older texts also named Wedelbe(c)k) is a river of Hamburg and Schleswig-Holstein, Germany. It flows into the Elbe near Wedel.

See also

List of rivers of Hamburg
List of rivers of Schleswig-Holstein

Rivers of Hamburg
Rivers of Schleswig-Holstein
Rivers of Germany